Harpalus affinis is a species of ground beetle native to the Palearctic, and introduced in the Nearctic and the Australasian region. In Europe, it is only absent in the following countries or islands: the Azores, the Canary Islands, the Channel Islands, Crete, Cyclades, Dodecanese, the Faroe Islands, Franz Josef Land, Gibraltar, Iceland, Madeira, Malta, Monaco, the North Aegean islands, Novaya Zemlya, San Marino, the Savage Islands, Sicily, Svalbard and Jan Mayen, and Vatican City. Its presence on the Balearic Islands and Sardinia is doubtful.

Description
Their surface is metallic bronze, green or blue coloured.

Distribution
Harpalus affinis is present in the Palearctic realm, from Europe to Siberia. It was introduced in North America and is now present in several Canadian provinces, from British Columbia to the Maritimes. It became established in New Zealand in the mid to late 1970s.

References

External links

affinis
Beetles of Europe
Beetles described in 1781
Beetles of New Zealand
Taxa named by Franz von Paula Schrank